Werner Lassen (born 1974) is a Namibian amateur golfer. By profession a photocopy machine sales manager, he has appeared in numerous amateur tournaments both within his country and outside of it.

Bank Windhoek Namibian Open Golf Tournament
In May 2007, Lassen won the Bank Windhoek Namibian Open Golf Tournament for a record 10th time in 15 years, beating Andrew Dodds in a sudden death playoff. He holds the record for the most Open victories over Adri Basson (5 time winner).

International competition
Lassen is a member of the Namibian national amateur golf team and competed in the 2006 Eisenhower Trophy amateur golf tournament in Cape Town, South Africa.

Sources
 List of storylines of Eisenhower Trophy (see Namibia)
 Lassen wins Namibian Open after play-off namibiasport.com, 5 May 2007

Namibian male golfers
Amateur golfers
1974 births
Living people